The 1956 Kansas City Athletics season, the team's 56th in the American League and second in Kansas City, involved the A's finishing 8th in the American League with a record of 52 wins and 102 losses, 45 games behind the World Series champion New York Yankees.

Offseason 
 March 2, 1956: Tommy Lasorda was purchased by the Athletics from the Brooklyn Dodgers.

Regular season

Season standings

Record vs. opponents

Notable transactions 
 April 16, 1956: Lee Wheat, Tom Saffell and cash were traded by the Athletics to the Brooklyn Dodgers for Tim Thompson.
 April 16, 1956: Johnny Groth was purchased by the Athletics from the Washington Senators.
 May 1956: Marion Fricano and $60,000 were traded by the Athletics to the Toronto Maple Leafs for Jack Crimian.
 June 14, 1956: Moe Burtschy, Bill Renna and cash were traded by the Athletics to the New York Yankees for Lou Skizas and Eddie Robinson.
 July 11, 1956: Tommy Lasorda was traded by the Athletics to the New York Yankees for Wally Burnette.
 August 17, 1956: Joe Ginsberg was traded by the Athletics to the Baltimore Orioles for Hal Smith.
 August 25, 1956: Enos Slaughter was selected off waivers from the Athletics by the New York Yankees.

Roster

Player stats

Batting

Starters by position 
Note: Pos = Position; G = Games played; AB = At bats; H = Hits; Avg. = Batting average; HR = Home runs; RBI = Runs batted in

Other batters 
Note: G = Games played; AB = At bats; H = Hits; Avg. = Batting average; HR = Home runs; RBI = Runs batted in

Pitching

Starting pitchers 
Note: G = Games pitched; IP = Innings pitched; W = Wins; L = Losses; ERA = Earned run average; SO = Strikeouts

Other pitchers 
Note: G = Games pitched; IP = Innings pitched; W = Wins; L = Losses; ERA = Earned run average; SO = Strikeouts

Relief pitchers 
Note: G = Games pitched; W = Wins; L = Losses; SV = Saves; ERA = Earned run average; SO = Strikeouts

Farm system 

LEAGUE CHAMPIONS: Seminole

References

External links
1956 Kansas City Athletics team page at Baseball Reference
1956 Kansas City Athletics team page at www.baseball-almanac.com

Oakland Athletics seasons
Kansas City Athletics season
1956 in sports in Missouri